An auto battler, also known as auto chess, is a subgenre of strategy video games that typically feature chess-like elements where players place characters on a grid-shaped battlefield during a preparation phase, who then fight the opposing team's characters without any further direct input from the player. The genre was popularized by Dota Auto Chess in early 2019 and saw other games in the genre released soon after by more established  studios, such as Teamfight Tactics, Dota Underlords, and Hearthstone's Battlegrounds.

Gameplay 

Auto battler games typically feature multiple players competing against each other as individuals, similar to a battle royale. Each player fields a team of units, sometimes called minions, with the player being tasked to assemble the strongest possible team. Once each player has selected some initial units, players are paired off randomly for a series of 1-versus-1 battles. In combat, both players units are placed on the board and automatically battle each other, typically without player input. When one team is completely defeated, with none of that player's units being able to continue fighting, the loser takes a penalty to their hit points, and the game moves on to the next phase. After the battle phase, at the start of each round, players buy units, which can be combined to make stronger versions of the same units. Units may be divided into multiple categories, with combat bonuses awarded for stacking multiple units of the same type. If a player loses all their health, they are eliminated from the match.

History 
The roots of the genre can be traced back to "Pokémon Defense", a custom tower defense mode in Warcraft III. However, the codifier of the genre is Dota Auto Chess, a custom game mode for Dota 2, which was released by the group of Chinese developers known as Drodo Studio in January 2019. The popularity of the mod, with it having over eight million players by May 2019, led to the proliferation of the genre after the unique gameplay of "Pokémon Defense" and other similar custom maps of Warcraft III heyday had been largely forgotten. The first standalone game in the genre was Valve's Dota Underlords, which was followed by other in-game mods such as Teamfight Tactics, released within Riot Games' League of Legends, and Battlegrounds in Blizzard Entertainment's Hearthstone. Drodo Studio released their own standalone version, Auto Chess, later in 2019.

References

 
Video game genres
Video game terminology